Bagthorpe may refer to:

 Bagthorpe, Norfolk, England
 Bagthorpe, Nottinghamshire, England
 The Bagthorpe Saga, a series of books by Helen Cresswell

See also
 Bagthorpe with Barmer, a civil parish in Norfolk, England
 
 William Babthorpe (1489/90–1555), English politician
 Bugthorpe, East Riding of Yorkshire, England